Lino Marzorati (born 12 October 1986) is an Italian footballer who plays as a defender. For most of his career Marzorati's last name had been spelled with two t's, but in early 2007 he announced it was an error and his name is spelled only with one t. However his last name is still officially registered as Marzoratti.

Club career
Defined a bright prospect by A.C. Milan coach Carlo Ancelotti, Marzorati, who played for the team's youth academy, was called to join the first team squad during the 2004-05 season. He was sold to Empoli in a co-ownership deal for €750,000 after a successful loan in 2007 (along with Nicola Pozzi, Luca Antonini and Ignazio Abate) and later Empoli fully contracted with the player for €1.5 million (however, along with Pozzi (€3.25M), fully counter-weight by the return of Antonini (€2.75M) and Abate (€2M). In summer 2009 he joined Cagliari Calcio in another co-ownership deal, for €1 million. In June 2010 he was bought back by Empoli for just €300,000.

In summer 2011 he was sold to fellow Serie B club U.S. Sassuolo Calcio for just €200,000 in co-ownership deal on a 3-year deal. He was signed outright for another €200,000 circa January 2012.

On 28 January 2014, Marzorati left Serie A side Sassuolo for Serie B side Modena, signing a -year deal.

On 10 July 2019, he signed a 2-year contract with Cavese. On 7 September 2020, he transferred to Lecco.

International career
Marzorati represented Italy U-20 in the FIFA World Youth Championship 2005. On 12 December 2006, he made his International under-21 debut against Luxembourg.

Career statistics

Club

Honours

Club
Sasssuolo
 Serie B: 2012–13

References

External links
FIGC 

1986 births
Living people
People from Rho, Lombardy
Footballers from Lombardy
Italian footballers
Association football fullbacks
Serie A players
Serie B players
Serie C players
A.C. Milan players
Empoli F.C. players
Cagliari Calcio players
U.S. Sassuolo Calcio players
Modena F.C. players
A.C. Prato players
S.S. Juve Stabia players
Cavese 1919 players
Calcio Lecco 1912 players
Italy youth international footballers
Italy under-21 international footballers
Sportspeople from the Metropolitan City of Milan